Emrol Phillip (born 26 June 1966) is retired male amateur boxer from Grenada, who fought at the 1984 Summer Olympics in the men's lightweight division.

References

Grenadian male boxers
Living people
Lightweight boxers
Boxers at the 1984 Summer Olympics
Olympic boxers of Grenada
1966 births